The CV postcode area, also known as the Coventry postcode area, is a group of 24 postcode districts in central England, within eleven post towns. These cover the eastern part of the West Midlands county (including Coventry), most of Warwickshire (including Atherstone, Bedworth, Kenilworth, Leamington Spa, Nuneaton, Rugby, Shipston-on-Stour, Southam, Stratford-upon-Avon and Warwick), a part of west Leicestershire and a very small part of Northamptonshire.

The postcode areas CV1 to CV6 incorporate the city of Coventry and its contiguous suburbs, with CV7 covering several rural and suburban villages to the immediate west and north of the city (where Coventry remains the post town), ie, the eastern portion of Solihull Borough and the southernmost areas of the Nuneaton & Bedworth District. 

CV8 to CV47 covers all other post towns in the postcode area, to the north, south and east of Coventry (full coverage listed below). 

The CV area borders seven other postcode areas : B (Birmingham), LE (Leicester), DE (Derby), NN (Northampton), WR (Worcester), GL (Gloucester) and OX (Oxford).
 


Coverage
The approximate coverage of the postcode districts:

|-
! CV1
| COVENTRY
| Coventry C (Coventry City Centre, Gosford Green, Hillfields, Spon End, Bishopsgate Green Coventry University)
| Coventry
|-
! CV2
| COVENTRY
| Coventry NE (Walsgrave, Wyken, Stoke, Bell Green, Wood End, Potters Green, Aldermans Green, Clifford Park, Woodway Park)
| Coventry
|-
! CV3
| COVENTRY
| Coventry SE (Binley, Whitley, Willenhall, Cheylesmore, Styvechale, Finham, Fenside, Stoke Aldermoor, Green Lane, Ernesford Grange, Binley Woods)
| Coventry, Rugby
|-
! CV4
| COVENTRY
| Coventry SW (Tile Hill, Canley, Cannon Park, Lime Tree Park, Gibbet Hill, Westwood Heath, University of Warwick)
| Coventry
|-
! CV5
| COVENTRY
| Coventry NW (Allesley, Allesley Park, Allesley Green, Earlsdon, Eastern Green, Whoberley, Chapelfields, Mount Nod, Brownshill Green)
| Coventry
|-
! CV6
| COVENTRY
| Coventry N (Holbrooks, Coundon, Radford, Upper Foleshill, Longford, Rowley's Green, Courthouse Green, Whitmore Park), Hawkesbury
| Coventry, Nuneaton and Bedworth
|-
! CV7
| COVENTRY
| Exhall, Ash Green, Keresley, Meriden, Balsall Common, Berkswell, Corley, Arley, Ansty, Shilton, Fillongley
| Nuneaton and Bedworth, North Warwickshire, Coventry, Rugby, Solihull
|-
!rowspan=2|CV8
| COVENTRY
| Wolston, Ryton-on-Dunsmore
|rowspan=2| Warwick, Rugby
|-
| KENILWORTH
| Kenilworth, Baginton, Bubbenhall, Burton Green, Brandon, Stoneleigh, Ashow
|-
! CV9
| ATHERSTONE
| Atherstone, Mancetter, Grendon, Baddesley Ensor, Baxterley, Hurley, Witherley, Wood End, Twycross, Orton On The Hill, Ridge Lane Village
| North Warwickshire, Hinckley and Bosworth
|-
! CV10
| NUNEATON
| Nuneaton N & W (Weddington, Stockingford, Camp Hill, Galley Common, Grove Farm, Whittleford, Chapel End, Bermuda Village), Caldecote, Fenny Drayton, Hartshill, Ansley, Astley, Oldbury, Ridge Lane
| Nuneaton and Bedworth, North Warwickshire
|-
! CV11
| NUNEATON
| Nuneaton C & E (town centre, Abbey Green, St Nicolas Park, Horeston Grange, Attleborough, Whitestone, Hill Top, Chilvers Coton, Caldwell), Burton Hastings, Bramcote
| Nuneaton and Bedworth, Rugby, Hinckley and Bosworth
|-
! CV12
| BEDWORTH
| Bedworth (except Exhall and Ash Green), Bulkington
| Nuneaton and Bedworth
|-
! CV13
| NUNEATON
| Barlestone, Barton in the Beans, Bilstone, Cadeby, Carlton, Congerstone, Dadlington, Fenny Drayton, Higham on the Hill, Market Bosworth, Nailstone, Odstone, Osbaston, Shackerstone, Shenton, Stoke Golding, Sutton Cheney, Upton, Wellsborough
| Hinckley and Bosworth
|-
! CV21
| RUGBY
| Rugby (north), Brownsover
| Rugby
|-
! CV22
| RUGBY
| Rugby (south), Bilton, Cawston, Dunchurch
| Rugby
|-
! CV23
| RUGBY
| Thurlaston, Princethorpe, Stretton-on-Dunsmore, Birdingbury, Brinklow, Long Lawford, Clifton upon Dunsmore, Stretton-under-Fosse, Monks Kirby, Kilsby
| Rugby, West Northamptonshire
|-
! CV31
| LEAMINGTON SPA
| Leamington Spa (south), Sydenham, Whitnash, Radford Semele
| Warwick
|-
! CV32
| LEAMINGTON SPA
| Leamington Spa (north), Lillington, Cubbington, Milverton, Campion Hills
| Warwick
|-
! CV33
| LEAMINGTON SPA
| Harbury and surrounding villages
| Warwick, Stratford-on-Avon
|-
! CV34
| WARWICK
| Warwick
| Warwick, Heathcote
|-
! CV35
| WARWICK
| Wellesbourne, Gaydon, Kineton and surrounding villages
| Warwick, Stratford-on-Avon
|-
! CV36
| SHIPSTON-ON-STOUR
| Shipston-on-Stour and surrounding villages
| Stratford-on-Avon
|-
! CV37
| STRATFORD-UPON-AVON
| Stratford-upon-Avon and surrounding villages
| Stratford-on-Avon
|-
! CV47
| SOUTHAM
| Southam and surrounding villages
| Stratford-on-Avon
|}

The CV47 district was formed in 1999 from parts of the CV23 and CV33 districts.

Map

See also
List of postcode areas in the United Kingdom
Centre points of the United Kingdom
Postcode Address File

References

External links
A quick introduction to Royal Mail's Postcode Address File (PAF)

 
Postcode areas covering the West Midlands (region)
Postcode areas covering the East Midlands